was a Japanese football player. He played for Japan national team.

Club career
Shimizu was born in Hiroshima Prefecture. He played for his local club Rijo Shukyu-Dan. He won 1924 and 1925 Emperor's Cup with international players Shizuo Miyama and Sachi Kagawa.

National team career
In May 1923, Shimizu was selected Japan national team for 1923 Far Eastern Championship Games in Osaka. At this competition, on May 23, he debuted against Philippines. This match is Japan team first match in International A Match. Next day, he played and scored a goal against Republic of China. But Japan lost in both matches (1-2, v Philippines and 1-5, v Republic of China). He played 2 games and scored 1 goal for Japan in 1923.

After retirement
After retirement, Shimizu kept a kimono shop in Hiroshima. However, on August 6, 1945, he (aged 44) died with his wife (aged 38) (Atomic bombings of Hiroshima and Nagasaki).

National team statistics

References

External links
 
 Japan National Football Team Database

Year of birth missing
1945 deaths
Kobe University alumni
Association football people from Hiroshima Prefecture
Japanese footballers
Japan international footballers
Association football forwards
Japanese civilians killed in World War II
Deaths by airstrike during World War II
Hibakusha